The Provo City Center Temple is a temple of the Church of Jesus Christ of Latter-day Saints (LDS Church) on the same site as the former Provo Tabernacle in Provo, Utah. Completed in 2016, the temple utilizes much of the external shell of the tabernacle, all that remained of the original building after a fire in December 2010.

Announcement
The intent to construct the temple was announced by church president Thomas S. Monson on October 1, 2011, during the church's semi-annual general conference. The temple was announced concurrently with those to be built in Barranquilla, Colombia; Durban, South Africa; Kinshasa, DR Congo; and Star Valley, Wyoming, along with the temple in Paris, France which had been previously announced. At the time, this brought the total number of temples worldwide (either completed, under construction or announced) to 166 and the number of temples in Utah to 16. Provo became the second city in the LDS Church to have two temples, the first being South Jordan, Utah, with the Jordan River and Oquirrh Mountain temples. It is the second tabernacle in Utah to be converted to a temple, the first being the Vernal Utah Temple, and the fourth Latter-day Saint temple converted from an existing building. (The three previous being the Vernal Utah, Copenhagen Denmark, and Manhattan New York temples.) It is one of only two Latter-day Saint temples not to include the name of the state/province or country in which the temple is located (the other being the Salt Lake Temple).

Site and development 

The temple is located on the property where the Provo Tabernacle once stood. Historically, the tabernacle was used for church meetings and cultural events. In the early morning of December 17, 2010, a fire was reported at the tabernacle where firefighters found smoke coming from the building. At first firefighters thought that there might be a chance to save the roof and thus the outward structural integrity of the building, but at around 6:00 AM the roof collapsed. The Provo City Fire Department concluded that "[t]he most probable proximate cause of the fire ... is a heat source, specifically an energized 300-watt lamp, which was placed too close to combustible materials, specifically a wooden speaker enclosure." 

In the fire, a copy of Harry Anderson's "The Second Coming" was entirely burned except for the outline of Jesus Christ. The painting was preserved for the LDS Church's archives.

Monson stated that the temple will "include a complete restoration of the original exterior," and the artist's rendition in the press release includes the central tower from the original building. Jeffrey R. Holland presided at the groundbreaking on May 12, 2012.

During construction, the remaining tabernacle structure was fortified with six to 10 inches of reinforced concrete, combined with three rows of brick. It was supported on a structure of steel and concrete piles set at the planned altitude for the final building. Space for two below-grade stories was excavated before beginning work on the above-ground portions of the temple. The excavation went down 40 feet. With the water level between 15 and 20 feet, a large amount of water was removed in the process. Consistent with construction of most Latter-day Saint temples, on March 31, 2014, a statue of the angel Moroni was installed on top of the temple.

Open house and dedication
A public open house was held from January 15 through March 5, 2016, excluding Sundays.

The temple was dedicated on March 20, 2016, by Dallin H. Oaks of the Quorum of the Twelve Apostles. Russell M. Nelson, the President of the Quorum of the Twelve Apostles, was in attendance at one of the three sessions. Also in attendance at one or more sessions were M. Russell Ballard and Gary E. Stevenson, both of the Quorum of the Twelve; members of the Presidency of the Seventy; members of the Seventy responsible for overseeing the church's Temple Department (Kent F. Richards, executive director, and Michael T. Ringwood and Larry Y. Wilson, Assistant Executive Directors); Dean M. Davies, First Counselor in the Presiding Bishopric; and auxiliary leaders, including Bonnie L. Oscarson, Young Women General President.

Grounds and architecture 
While keeping the exterior style of the Provo Tabernacle, the interior of the building was redesigned for its new function. The changes to the interior were drawn from themes from Victorian architecture from several of the region's historic buildings including the Gardo House, the Utah Governor's Mansion, and the Salt Lake Assembly Hall. Stained glass from the original tabernacle was used in the reconstruction. 

The grounds also contain a pavilion with a replica of the Christus statue for visitors and wedding guests to wait in.

See also

 The Church of Jesus Christ of Latter-day Saints in Utah
 Comparison of temples of The Church of Jesus Christ of Latter-day Saints
 List of temples of The Church of Jesus Christ of Latter-day Saints
 List of temples of The Church of Jesus Christ of Latter-day Saints by geographic region
 Temple architecture (Latter-day Saints)

References

External links

Provo City Center Temple Official site
Provo City Center Temple at ChurchofJesusChristTemples.org
 Provo City Center Temple Construction Blog

21st-century Latter Day Saint temples
Buildings and structures in Provo, Utah
Temples (LDS Church) in Utah
Religious buildings and structures in Utah County, Utah
2016 establishments in Utah
Articles containing video clips
Religious buildings and structures completed in 2016
2016 in Christianity
Tourist attractions in Provo, Utah